Hans Kristian Amundsen (2 December 1959 – 29 July 2018) was a Norwegian newspaper editor and politician for the Labour Party.

In January 2011 he was appointed State Secretary in the Ministry of Fisheries and Coastal Affairs. In May 2011 he moved to the Office of the Prime Minister. He was formerly the editor-in-chief of Nordlys.

References

1959 births
2018 deaths
Norwegian newspaper editors
Politicians from Tromsø
Labour Party (Norway) politicians
Norwegian state secretaries